Acate (Sicilian: Acati or Vischiri) is a small town and comune in the south of Sicily, Italy, part of the province of Ragusa.  It is located in the Dirillo River valley,  from Ragusa.

Until 1938 it was called Biscari, and its history dates back until the 14th century. During World War II it was the location of the Biscari Massacre, in which American troops killed numerous unarmed German and Italian soldiers.

Twin towns
 Chambly, France

References

Municipalities of the Province of Ragusa